Adrienne Elizabeth Martelli (born December 3, 1987) is an American female crew rower from University Place, Washington. She took an Olympic bronze medal in 2012 and a gold medal in the 2015 World Championships.

Life
Born in Glendale, California, Martelli graduated from Curtis Senior High School in University Place, Washington, and the University of Washington.

Martelli won a bronze medal at the 2012 Summer Olympics in the quadruple sculls event.

In 2015 Martelli, Kristine O'Brien, Grace Latz and Grace Luczak took the gold medal at the 2015 – World Championships.

References

External links
 
 
 

1987 births
Living people
Rowers at the 2012 Summer Olympics
Rowers at the 2016 Summer Olympics
Olympic bronze medalists for the United States in rowing
American female rowers
University of Washington alumni
Medalists at the 2012 Summer Olympics
World Rowing Championships medalists for the United States
People from Glendale, California
21st-century American women